The Greenhouse Theater Center is a professional, non-profit theater located in the heart of Chicago's Lincoln Park. The Greenhouse Theater Center hosts multiple Off-Loop theater companies, including Eclipse Theatre Company, Hubris Productions, MPAACT, Organic Theatre Company, Remy Bumppo Theatre Company, The Magic Cabaret, and Theater Seven Of Chicago.

History
Founded in 2008, the Greenhouse Theater Center was the original home for the Body Politic Theater and Victory Gardens Theater.

The Wendy and William Spatz Charitable Foundation purchased the theater building from Victory Gardens Theater with a promise to maintain the current function of the building as a multi-stage theater space. The Greenhouse Theater Center is as an "incubator" for small to mid-size theater companies, hence its name.

This multi-stage artists' space provides five stages, dressing and staging areas, as well as, office space for resident companies to grow.

Educational outreach

The Greenhouse Theater Center is home to Lil' Buds Theatre Company as well as Marsha's Music. Both organizations provide various arts education to children through classes and summer camps. The Greenhouse Theater Center is also home to the Institute for Arts Entrepreneurship and their partner with the Norway-based Ensemble Free Theater. This international endeavour will kick off with Chicago playing host to the Norwegian students enrolled in this new program and taking classes in the four Greenhouse Theater Center spaces with performances at both Greenhouse and Gorilla Tango Theatre.

References

External links 
 Greenhouse Theater Center Homepage
 Greenhouse Theater Center Mission and History

Theatres in Chicago